Roberto Arioldi (born 29 November 1955) is an Italian equestrian. He competed in two events at the 2004 Summer Olympics.

References

1955 births
Living people
Italian male equestrians
Olympic equestrians of Italy
Equestrians at the 2004 Summer Olympics
Competitors at the 1997 Mediterranean Games
Competitors at the 2005 Mediterranean Games
Sportspeople from Monza
Mediterranean Games medalists in equestrian
Mediterranean Games gold medalists for Italy
Mediterranean Games silver medalists for Italy